Spyros Marangos (born 20 February 1967) is a former Greek football player. He played for Panionios, Panathinaikos, PAOK, Omonia and APOEL at the club level. He also made 26 appearances for the Greece national football team, and participated at the 1994 FIFA World Cup.

He later became a coach.

References

1967 births
Living people
People from Lefkada
Greek footballers
Greek expatriate footballers
Greece international footballers
Super League Greece players
Panathinaikos F.C. players
APOEL FC players
AC Omonia players
PAOK FC players
Panionios F.C. players
Panetolikos F.C. managers
Cypriot First Division players
1994 FIFA World Cup players
Expatriate footballers in Cyprus
Greek expatriate sportspeople in Cyprus
Association football midfielders
Greek football managers
Proodeftiki F.C. managers
Koropi F.C. managers
Panathinaikos F.C. non-playing staff
Sportspeople from the Ionian Islands (region)